Mahmoud Omar Shelbaieh (born 20 May 1980) is a Jordanian former footballer who played as a striker. He earned 66 international caps for the Jordanian national team, scoring 22 goals.

International career 
The last match Shelbaieh played with his national team Jordan was against Singapore on 11 October 2011 in the 2014 FIFA World Cup qualification, in which he entered as a substitute for his teammate Ahmad Hayel and resulted in a 3–0 victory for Jordan.

Honors

In AFC Asian Cups 
 2004 Asian Cup

In Arab Nations Cup 
 2002 Arab Nations Cup

In WAFF Championships 
 2002 WAFF Championship
 2004 WAFF Championship
 2007 WAFF Championship
 2008 WAFF Championship

International goals

References
 Mahmoud Shelbaieh Second Top Scorer of the AFC Cup Tournament
 Jordanian Shelbaieh Competes for the Title of the Top Scorer of the AFC Cup Tournament
 Jordanian Shelbaieh: "My Presence in the List of Top Scorers in the World Gives Me a New Incentive to Shine"
 Jordanian Shelbaieh: "Al-Wahdat Will Continue its Asian Opponents and Jordan Can Reach the World Cup"
 Jordanian Shelbaieh Awarded as Top Scorer of the AFC Cup Tournament in History
 Jordanian Shelbaieh: "I Will Not Play for Any Other Club in Jordan Except for Al-Wahdat" 
 Mahmoud Shelbaieh: "My Goal on Japan is Still Firmly on My Mind"
 Deeb and Shelbaieh Both Share the Title of Top Scorer of the Jordan League (2012–2013)
 Mahmoud Shelbaieh Heading to Bahrain to Officially Take Proficiency in East Riffa Club

External links 
 
 
 

1980 births
Living people
Jordanian footballers
Jordan international footballers
2004 AFC Asian Cup players
Association football forwards
Al-Wehdat SC players
east Riffa Club players
Al-Jazeera (Jordan) players
Jordanian people of Palestinian descent
Sportspeople from Amman